Pinnacle One Yonge is a mixed-use development currently under construction in Toronto, Ontario, Canada. It will consist of six skyscrapers ranging in height from 22 to 95 storeys tall. The building known as the SkyTower will be Canada's tallest building.

On October 25, 2022, the developer Pinnacle International submitted an application to the City of Toronto to increase the height of the two tallest towers. The proposal will add 10 stories to SkyTower, an increase from 95 to 105 stories, increasing its height from 312 meters to 346 meters, making it the tallest building in Toronto, as well as potentially the tallest residential building in the world by floor count. The 80-story third tower would see 12 stories added, becoming 92 stories tall. The total height would be increased from 264 meters to 302 meters. The proposal has not yet been approved by the city.

References

Buildings and structures in Toronto
Buildings and structures under construction in Canada